The Powelltown tramway was a  narrow gauge tramway that operated between Powelltown and Yarra Junction, Victoria, Australia, between 1913 and 1945.

The tramway was owned by the sawmill at Powelltown and its primary role was to move sawn timber from the mill to the main railway system. However, it also operated a timetabled passenger service, and carried goods as a common carrier. The tramway also operated a number of logging tramways into the forest east of Powelltown.

The right-of-way has been converted into the Powelltown Tramway Rail Trail. It is on private property and there is limited access to the line.

Location 
The  timber railway connected the  Victorian Railways at Yarra Junction. There was a sawmill in Powelltown, and the line ran from there to the forest areas further east. The track ran through a  tunnel, constructed in 1925, and over several large trestle bridges.

History

Construction 
The Powelltown tramway was built in 1912–13 by Victorian Powell Wood Process Ltd (VPWP). Although the forest railways to Beech Forest, Gembrook and Walhalla were built with a  gauge, existing horse-drawn railways with wooden rails in the Powelltown area used a  gauge, so the decision was made to conform with that, meaning that timber on long timber trucks could be transported without transhipment. Bridges over watercourses were almost identical to those seen in Western Australia.

Operation 
Trains ran three times a day to transport long timber. To be on the safe side, the long timber trolleys were decoupled from the locomotive on the incline and they were retarded using brakes attached to the trolleys. The steam locomotive then followed at its maximum speed. Around 30 giant eucalyptus trees, containing around 30,000 super feet (70 cubic metres) of timber, were felled and sawn each day. There were also scheduled passenger services, using mixed passenger and freight trains.

Change of ownership 
The Powell wood preservation process used by the VPWP was unsuccessful, so the company became insolvent in 1914. Its assets were taken over by the Victorian Hardwood Milling & Seasoning Company, which had far less capital than its predecessor.

Usage today 
The right-of-way of the former railway now forms a 45-km-long hiking trail, the Powelltown Tramway Rail Trail. It runs on private land, so access is limited to the path itself. It has been removed from the Victorian Heritage Register.

Two piles of sawdust, an old winch, and a steam boiler are all that is left to pinpoint the locations of the former bush mills along this section.

Locomotives 

The forest railway was initially operated with two brand-new steam locomotives specially built for it:
 Little Yarra, a Baldwin 2-4-0 locomotive (builder no. 37718 of 1912) was primarily intended for mixed passenger and freight traffic.
 Powellite, a Bagnall 0-6-0 locomotive (builder no. 1965 of 1913) was mainly used to transport sawn timber, but was also used to transport long timber in the bush. It was only delivered in 1914, and this delay in delivery may have been the reason why Squirt was procured.

They also purchased four-second-hand locomotive:
 Squirt, an Andrew Barclay and Sons 0-4-2ST locomotive (builder no. 311 of 1888), from the Warburton – Big Pats Creek Tramway. With it, the wooden bogies of the log trucks were pulled uphill into the cleared areas, which then rolled back to Powelltown into the valley after loading during a later trip, sometimes only driven by gravity.
 In April 1916, Coffee Pot, a Kerr Stuart 0-4-0T locomotive (builder no. 643 of 1898), from the Tasmanian Gold Mining Company in Beaconsfield, Tasmania.
 In 1919, a Lima 0-4-4-0TG Shay geared locomotive (builder no. 2575 from 1912), from the Abercrombie Copper Mines Limited in Burraga, New South Wales.
 In 1927, Green Beetle, another Lima 0-4-4-0TG Shay geared locomotive (builder no. 2576 from 1912), from the Hoskins Steel Works in Lithgow, New South Wales. It, like its identical sister locomotive 2575, was involved in a fire that destroyed all wooden parts and bent the frame. It was refurbished in the Powelltown workshops, with the damaged section cut out of the frame. As a result, it was a little shorter than before and offered less space in the driver's cab.

With the exception of Squirt, which was withdrawn from service and dismantled in the 1930s, all steam locomotives were used until the forest railway was closed in 1944. Only Powellite was later used on the Nauru narrow-gauge railway to transport phosphate.

Surviving 
 Shay 2575—Scrapped 1947. The remains of the boiler still exist at Carpolac in Western Victoria, but in bad condition, some other parts may exist by lucky thieves from the 1960s.
 Shay 2576—Owned since mid-1960s by M. McEwen, who located the remains, frame, boiler, tank, cylinders and many other parts. No trucks survived. Currently located in Melbourne.

Further reading 
 The Powelltown Tramway Buckland, John Australian Railway Historical Society Bulletin, August 1940
 Locomotives of the Powelltown Tramway Buckland, John Australian Railway Historical Society Bulletin, September 1940
Powelltown Tramway Centenary 1913–2013 Mike McCarthy and Frank Stamford,

References

Further reading
  (151 pages)

External links 

 

3 ft gauge railways in Australia
Railway lines in Victoria (Australia)
Defunct railway companies of Australia
Yarra Valley
Rail trails in Victoria (Australia)
Railway lines opened in 1913
Railway lines closed in 1945
1913 establishments in Australia